Miss Marx is a 2020 biographical period drama film about Eleanor Marx, written and directed by Susanna Nicchiarelli. A co-production between Italy and Belgium, this English-language film stars Romola Garai as Marx and Patrick Kennedy as her lover Edward Aveling.

It had its world premiere in the main international competition section at the 77th Venice Film Festival on 5 September 2020.

Plot
The educated and brilliant Eleanor Marx, the youngest daughter of Karl Marx, is at the forefront of promoting socialism in the United Kingdom, participating in workers' struggles, fighting for women's rights and the abolition of child labor. In 1883, she met Edward Aveling, a talented playwright but a selfish and wasteful man. While he is intent on getting into debt and consuming the legacy left to Eleanor by Friedrich Engels, Edward does not realize that he is also consuming the entire existence of his devoted companion, who, although aware that she is experiencing the same "moral oppression" imposed by the patriarchy and condemned by her, she is unable to redeem her own happiness, and ultimately not even her own life. In the scene where Eleanor and Edward play the famous dialogue between Nora and Helmer during the staging of Ibsen's A Doll's House, the two characters seem to trace through the words of another the unjust fate destined for Eleanor as well as for many others: the fate of a woman conditioned and limited throughout her life by the male figures most dear to her. In 1898 Eleanor loses all energy and, addicted to opium, kills herself.

Cast

Production

Release
The film had its world premiere in the main international competition section at the 77th Venice Film Festival on 5 September 2020. It was released in Italy by 01 Distribution on 17 September 2020.

Reception

Box office
Miss Marx grossed a worldwide total of $590,376.

Critical reception

Awards and nominations

David di Donatello Awards (2021)
 David di Donatello for Best Producer to Marta Donzelli, Gregorio Paonessa, Joseph Rouschop and Valérie Bournonville
 David di Donatello for Best Costumes to Massimo Cantini Parrini
 David di Donatello for Best Score to Gatto Ciliegia contro il Grande Freddo and Downtown Boys
 Nomination for David di Donatello for Best Film
 Nomination for David di Donatello for Best Director to Susanna Nicchiarelli
 Nomination for David di Donatello for Best Cinematography to Crystel Fournier
 Nomination for David di Donatello for Best Sets and Decorations to Alessandro Vannucci, Igor Gabriel and Fiorella Cicolini
 Nomination for David di Donatello for Best Makeup to Diego Prestopino
 Nomination for David di Donatello for Best Hair Design to Domingo Santoro
 Nomination for David di Donatello for Best Visual Effects to Massimiliano Battista
 Nomination for David di Donatello for Best Sound to Adriano Di Lorenzo, Pierpaolo Merafino, Marc Bastien, Pierre Greco and Franco Piscopo

References

External links

2020 biographical drama films
English-language Belgian films
English-language Italian films
Italian historical drama films
Italian biographical drama films
Belgian biographical drama films
Films directed by Susanna Nicchiarelli
Films shot in Italy
2020s feminist films
Films set in London
Films set in 1883
Films set in 1890
Films set in 1895
Films set in 1896
Films set in 1898
Films set in the Victorian era
Cultural depictions of Karl Marx
Films about social class
Belgian historical drama films
2020s historical drama films
2020s English-language films
2020s Italian films